Megachile xanthothrix is a species of bee in the family Megachilidae. It was described by Yasumatsu & Hirashima in 1964.

References

Xanthothrix
Insects described in 1964